Kenny Barron (born June 9, 1943) is an American jazz pianist, who has appeared on hundreds of recordings as leader and sideman and is considered one of the most influential mainstream jazz pianists since the bebop era.

Biography
Born in Philadelphia, Pennsylvania, Kenny Barron is the younger brother of tenor saxophonist Bill Barron (1927–1989). One of his first gigs was as pianist with the Dizzy Gillespie quartet. Barron was briefly a member of the Jazztet around 1962, but did not record with them.

He graduated in 1978 with a BA in arts from Empire State College (Metropolitan Center, New York City).

He co-led the groups Sphere and the Classical Jazz Quartet.

Between 1987 and 1991, Barron recorded several albums with Stan Getz, most notably Voyage, Bossas & Ballads – The Lost Sessions, Serenity, Anniversary and People Time, a two-CD set.

He has been nominated nine times for Grammy Awards and for the American Jazz Hall of Fame. He was elected a Fellow of the American Academy of Arts and Sciences in 2009.

In May 2010, Barron was awarded an Honorary Doctorate of Music from Berklee College of Music along with African-born singer/songwriter Angelique Kidjo, Spanish guitarist Paco de Lucia, and songwriting duo Leon Huff and Kenneth Gamble.

For over 25 years, Barron taught piano and keyboard harmony at Rutgers University in New Jersey. He now teaches at the Juilliard School of Music.  His piano students have included Earl MacDonald, Harry Pickens, Jon Regen and Aaron Parks.

Discography 

 You Had Better Listen (Atlantic, 1967) with Jimmy Owens
 Sunset to Dawn (Muse, 1973)
 Peruvian Blue (Muse, 1974)
 In Tandem (Muse, 1975 [1980]) with Ted Dunbar
 Lucifer (Muse, 1975)
 Innocence (Wolf, 1978)
 Together (Denon, 1978) with Tommy Flanagan
 Golden Lotus (Muse, 1980 [1982])
 Kenny Barron at the Piano (Xanadu, 1981 [1982])
 Imo Live (Whynot, 1982)
 Spiral (Baybridge, 1982)
 Green Chimneys (Criss Cross Jazz, 1983)
 1+1+1 (BlackHawk, 1984 [1986]) with Ron Carter and Michael Moore
 Landscape (Baystate, 1984)
 Autumn in New York (Uptown, 1984) - reissued as New York Attitude
 Scratch (Enja, 1985)
 What If? (Enja, 1986)
 Two as One (Red, 1986) with Buster Williams
 The Red Barron Duo (Storyville, 1986 [1988]) with Red Mitchell
 Live at Fat Tuesdays (Enja, 1988)
 Rhythm-a-Ning (Candid, 1989) with John Hicks
 The Only One (Reservoir, 1990)
 Live at Maybeck Recital Hall Volume Ten (Concord Jazz, 1990)
 Invitation (Criss Cross Jazz, 1990)
 Lemuria-Seascape (Candid, 1991)
 Quickstep (Enja, 1991)
 The Moment (Reservoir, 1991 [1994])
 Confirmation (Candid, 1991) with Barry Harris
 Sambao (Verve, 1992)
 Other Places (Verve, 1993)
 Wanton Spirit (Verve, 1994) with Roy Haynes and Charlie Haden
 Things Unseen (Verve, 1995 [1997])
 Swamp Sally (Verve, 1995) with Mino Cinelu
 Live at Bradley's (EmArcy, 1996 [2001])
 Live at Bradley's II (Universal, 1996 [2005])
 Night and the City (Verve, 1996 [1998]) with Charlie Haden
 Spirit Song (Verve, 1999)
 Freefall (Verve, 2000) with Regina Carter
 Canta Brasil (Sunnyside, 2002)
 Images (Sunnyside, 2003)
 Super Standard (Venus, 2004)
 The Traveler (Sunnyside, 2007)
 Minor Blues (Venus, 2009)
 Kenny Barron & the Brazilian Knights (Sunnyside, 2012)
 The Art of Conversation (Impulse!, 2014) with Dave Holland
 Book of Intuition (Impulse!, 2016)
 Concentric Circles (Blue Note, 2018)
 Without Deception (Dare2, 2020) with Dave Holland
 The Source (Artwork, 2023)
Sources:

References

External links
Official website
Kenny Barron Discography at www.JazzDiscography.com
Int'l Jazz Prod.
Kenny Barron at NPR Music
I Remember Kenny Barron, by Steve Holt
Kenny Barron iPhone/iPad application

American jazz pianists
American male pianists
American jazz keyboardists
African-American pianists
African-American jazz musicians
Jazz fusion pianists
Mainstream jazz pianists
Post-bop pianists
Hard bop pianists
Musicians from Philadelphia
Enja Records artists
Muse Records artists
Red Records artists
Verve Records artists
Xanadu Records artists
Criss Cross Jazz artists
Candid Records artists
Chesky Records artists
1943 births
Living people
Fellows of the American Academy of Arts and Sciences
Empire State College alumni
20th-century American pianists
Jazz musicians from Pennsylvania
21st-century American keyboardists
21st-century American pianists
20th-century American male musicians
21st-century American male musicians
American male jazz musicians
Sphere (American band) members
The Jazztet members
Reservoir Records artists
African-American jazz pianists
20th-century African-American musicians
21st-century African-American musicians